Tomáš Rachůnek (born February 26, 1991) is a Czech professional ice hockey player. He played with HC Plzeň 1929 in the Czech Extraliga during the 2010–11 Czech Extraliga season. From 2008 to 2010, he played for Sault Ste. Marie Greyhounds in the Ontario Hockey League. He is the younger brother of Ivan Rachůnek and Karel Rachůnek who have also played professional ice hockey.

References

External links

Living people
1991 births
Czech ice hockey forwards
HC Plzeň players
Sportspeople from Zlín
Czech expatriate ice hockey players in Canada
Czech expatriate ice hockey players in Russia
Czech expatriate ice hockey players in Slovakia